USCGC Mackinaw has been the name of more than one United States Coast Guard ship, and may refer to:

 , an icebreaker in commission from 1944 to 2006
 , an icebreaker in commission since 2006

See also
 
 
 

United States Coast Guard ship names